This is a list of German musicians and bands.

A

 Apparat (Sascha Ring)
 Apache 207
 AnnenMayKantereit
 Georg Amft
Back to top

B

Kristina Bach
Bad Temper Joe
Bruno Balz
Bap
Baumstam
Blixa Bargeld
Beatsteaks
Anni Becker
Tim Bendzko
BeNuts
Andrea Berg
Jeanette Biedermann
Cinema Bizarre
Roy Black
Dieter Bohlen
Bonez MC
Andreas Bourani
Michael Bredl
Fettes Brot
Wighnomy Brothers
Hans-Jürgen Buchner, head of Haindling
Bushido

Back to top

C

C418
Cascada
Yvonne Catterfeld
Milky Chance
Sarah Connor
Javier Corcobado
Cro

Back to top

D

Franz Josef Degenhardt
Jan Delay
Samy Deluxe
Kurt Demmler
Anna Depenbusch
Drafi Deutscher
Marlene Dietrich
Herbert Dreilich, singer of Karat
Jürgen Drews
Dschinghis Khan

Back to top

E

Goby Eberhardt
Katja Ebstein
Echt
Eisbrecher
Margot Eskens
Elif Demirezer 
Extrabreit

Back to top

F

Die Fantastischen Vier (Michael Beck, Thomas Dürr, Michael B. Schmidt, Andreas Rieke)
Fehlfarben
Deutsch-Österreichisches Feingefühl
Fifty50
Helene Fischer
Joy Fleming
Fler
Fools Garden

Eko Fresh
FSK
Fuckin Wild
Fury in the Slaughterhouse

Back to top

G

Gamma Ray
Gunter Gabriel
Gestört aber GeiL
Carmen Geutjes
Rex Gildo
Dero Goi
Herbert Grönemeyer
Gertrud Grunow

Back to top

H

Helloween
Nina Hagen
H-Blockx
Hanne Haller
Heino
Guido Henneböhl
Stefanie Hertel
Michael Holm
Guildo Horn
Die toten Hosen (Andreas Frege)
Tokio Hotel
Annette Humpe

Back to top

I

Ideal

Back to top

J

Jamule
Jenson McKenzie
Juli (Eva Briegel)
Claudia Jung
Andrea Jürgens

Back to top

K

Kai Hansen
Roland Kaiser
Paul Kalkbrenner
Karat
Kilians
Kira
Alexander Klaws
KMFDM
Hildegard Knef
Christoph Koncz
Kraftklub
Kraftwerk
Peter Kraus
Kreator
Richard Kruspe
Daniel Küblböck
Paul Kuhn
Heinz Rudolf Kunze

Back to top

L

Klaus Lage
Paul Landers
Ute Lemper
Till Lindemann
Udo Lindenberg
Patrick Lindner
Christian Lorenz
Lucilectric
Hannfried Lucke
Karl-Hermann Lüer

Back to top

M

Michael Kiske
Boney M.
Madsen
Peter Maffay
Jürgen Marcus
Marteria
Noah McBeth aka NoMBe
Mark Medlock
Frl. Menke
Reinhard Mey
Lena Meyer-Landrut
MIA.
Michelle
Wolfgang Michels
Milhaven
Modeselektor
Werner Müller
Marius Müller-Westernhagen
Max Mutzke

Back to top

N

Xavier Naidoo
Nena
Einstürzende Neubauten
Nicole
Nimo (rapper)
NoMBe
Astrid North

Back to top

O

Oomph!
Overground
Obscura

Back to top

P

Panik
Mille Petrozza
Doro Pesch
Wolfgang Petry
Polarkreis 18
Powerwolf note: also Romanian
Die Prinzen
PUR

Back to top

Q

Back to top

R

Stefan Raab
Max Raabe
Rammstein
Achim Reichel
Matthias Reim
Rio Reiser
Revolverheld
Oliver Riedel
Mary Roos
Marianne Rosenberg
Rosenstolz
Anneliese Rothenberger
Robin Schulz

Back to top

S

Aneta Sablik
Sandra
Kool Savas
Schiller
Peter Schilling
Christoph Schneider
Michael Schulte
Robin Schulz
Scooter (H. P. Baxxter)
Scorpions
Selig
Shamall
The Shanes
Sido
Silbermond
Silicon Dream (1987–1995)
Spider Murphy Gang
Sportfreunde Stiller
Christina Stürmer
Geier Sturzflug

Back to top

T

Adel Tawil
Tic Tac Toe
Tokio Hotel
Trio
Tschilp
TheFatRat

Back to top

U

U96
Unheilig
Unterbiberger Hofmusik
Farin Urlaub (Die Ärzte)

Back to top

V

Lena Valaitis
Virtual Riot

Back to top

W

Hannes Wader
Stefan Waggershausen
Konstantin Wecker
Welle:Erdball
Ilse Werner
Paul Weschke
Wir Sind Helden
Joachim Witt
WizTheMc

Back to top

X

Back to top

Y

YOUNOTUS

Back to top

Z

Zedd

Back to top

See also

 List of Germans
 List of hip-hop musicians
 Lists of musicians
 Music of Germany
 :Category:German musicians

References

 
Musicians
Lists of musicians by nationality